Zinc titanate, also known as zinc titanium oxide, is an inorganic compound existing in three major forms: ZnTiO3 (ZnO-TiO2), Zn2TiO4 (2ZnO-TiO2) and Zn2Ti3O8 (2ZnO-3TiO2). It is used as a regenerable catalyst, a pigment and a sorbent of sulfur compounds at elevated temperatures. It is a white powder that is insoluble in water.

Synthesis and properties
The ZnTiO3, Zn2TiO4 and Zn2Ti3O8 forms crystallize in hexagonal, cubic (inverse spinel) and cubic structures, respectively. They can be produced by heating a mixture of ZnO and TiO2 powders or processing it with a ball mill. Zn2Ti3O8 forms at lowest temperatures, followed by ZnTiO3 and then Zn2TiO4; the last phase dominates at temperatures above 1000 °C.

References

titanate
Titanates